The Palaris Revolt of 1762–1765 was led by Juan de la Cruz Palaris, also known as "Pantaleón Pérez", of Binalatongan (now San Carlos City), Pangasinan.

Palaris' life 
Palaris was born in 1733 in Barrio Coliling of Binalatongan, the third child of Tomás Pérez, a cabeza de barangay. He had three brothers and a sister: the first two brothers died as young children, while the youngest son survived to adulthood and married. Their sister grew into a beautiful but manly woman who could kill a wild boar single-handedly, but she was later killed and devoured by wild boars.

It was not known whether Pantaleón Pérez was formally schooled as sources are silent on this matter, but he presumably acquired some form of practical education while in Manila, for when he returned to San Carlos, he was held in high esteem and the townsfolk looked up to him as cultured and refined. In the words of Governor-General Simón de Anda: "He once served as a coachman of Auditor Don Francisco Enríques de Villacorta." His dealings with his townsfoklk earned for him their confidence and respect and, being a dynamic and restless man, he easily became their leader.

History records him as Juan de la Cruz "Palaripar" then as "Palaris," but he was more popularly known as "Palaris". He was called "Palaripar" as he was the fastest runner, and his legs appeared to be twirling like an auger and the ground furrowed.

References

Battles involving Spain
Conflicts in 1762
Rebellions in the Philippines
History of Pangasinan
History of the Philippines (1565–1898)
1760s in Asia
18th century in the Philippines
1762 in the Philippines